James Mountain (1771 – September 23, 1813) was a prominent lawyer, educator and academic administrator in Western Pennsylvania during the early 19th century.  He was Master of Pittsburgh Academy (now University of Pittsburgh) from 1803 to 1807.  He was also among the earliest instructors and leaders of Canonsburg Academy (later Jefferson College and now Washington & Jefferson College).

References

Washington & Jefferson College faculty
Chancellors of the University of Pittsburgh
1771 births
Date of birth missing
1813 deaths
Pennsylvania lawyers
People from Washington County, Pennsylvania
Lawyers from Pittsburgh
Burials at Allegheny Cemetery
19th-century American lawyers